is a city located in Fukushima Prefecture, Japan. , the city had an estimated population of 76,251 in 38824 households, and a population density of 270 persons per km2.

Geography
Sukagawa is located in central Fukushima prefecture. 
Rivers: Abukuma River, Shakadogawa
Mountains: Uzumine (676.9m)

Neighboring municipalities
 Fukushima Prefecture
 Kōriyama
 Ten'ei
 Kagamiishi
 Tamakawa
 Hirata

Climate
Sukagawa has a humid climate (Köppen climate classification Cfa).

Demographics
Per Japanese census data, the population of Sukagawa peaked around the year 2000 and has declined slightly since then.

History
The area of present-day Sukagawa was part of ancient Mutsu Province. Remains from the Japanese Paleolithic through the Nara period and Heian period indicate continuous settlement of the area for many centuries. Sulagawa developed as a castle town of the Nikaido clan during the Kamakura period. The castle was destroyed by Date Masamune after his aunt Onamihime surrendered the castle during the Sengoku period. During the  Edo period the area prospered from its location as a major lodging place on Ōshū Kaidō, which is one of the Edo Five Routes, and was the commercial center in the region. The area was mostly administered as an exclave of Takada Domain under the Tokugawa Shogunate. After the Meiji restoration, it was organized as part of the Nakadōri region of Iwaki Province.

The village of Sukagawa was formed on April 1, 1889 with the creation of the modern municipalities system. However, after mid-Meiji period, the municipality was eclipsed by Kōriyama, which had succeeded in inviting the junction of West Ban'etsu Line with the Tōhoku Main Line train routes. On March 31, 1954, Sukagawa was elevated to city status after merging with the town of Hamada and villages of Nishibukuro and Inada (all from Iwase District), and the village of Oshioe (from Ishikawa District). Later, Sukagawa absorbed Niida Village (from Iwase District) on March 10, 1955, and then absorbed Ohigashi Village (from Ishikawa District) on February 1, 1967. On April 1, 2005, Sukagawa absorbed the town of Naganuma and village Iwase (both from Iwase District).

After the earthquake of 2011, the Fujinuma Dam collapsed resulting in seven fatalities. See also Radiation effects from Fukushima I nuclear accidents.

Government
Sulagawa has a mayor-council form of government with a directly elected mayor and a unicameral city legislature of 23 members. Tamura, together with Tamura District contributes three members to the Fukushima Prefectural Assembly. In terms of national politics, the city is part of Fukushima 3rd district of the lower house of the Diet of Japan.

Economy
Sukagawa has a mixed economy, and is a major commercial center for the surrounding region.

Education
Sukagawa has 17 public elementary schools and ten public junior high schools operated by the city government. The city has five public high schools operated by the Fukushima Prefectural Board of Education.

Transportation

Railway
JR East –  Tōhoku Main Line
 
JR East –  Suigun Line
  -

Highway
  – Sukagawa Interchange

Local attractions
Sukagawa Peony Garden
Uzumine
Shōnindan temple ruins
Sukagawa Ichirizuka
Beizanji Sutra Mounds
Fujinuma Dam
Taimatsu Akashi Festival

International relations
  Luoyang, China, Friendship city since August 1983

Noted people from Sukagawa
Eiji Tsuburaya, Movie director
Kōkichi Tsuburaya, Olympic marathon runner
Nakaba Suzuki, Manga artist
Mizuno Senko (1888–1919), writer
Dean Fujioka, Musician, actor

References

External links

 

 
Cities in Fukushima Prefecture